Leucadendron platyspermum, the plate-seed conebush, is a flower-bearing shrub belonging to the genus Leucadendron. It form part of the fynbos biome. The plant is native to the Western Cape where it occurs from the Donkerhoekberg near Villiersdorp, Groenlandberg and Kleinmondberge from Houhoek to the Elimvlakte.

The shrub grows 1.7 m tall and flowers in December. The plant dies after a fire but the seeds survive. The seeds are stored in a toll on the female plant and only fall to the ground after the first autumn rain after a fire. The seeds have wings and are spread by the wind. The plant is unisexual and there are separate plants with male and female flowers, which are pollinated by the wind. The plant grows mainly in sandy and shale soil at altitudes of 0 – 1 350 m.

In Afrikaans it is known as Kraaltolbos.

References

External links 
 Threatened Species Programme | SANBI Red List of South African Plants
 Leucadendron platyspermum (Plate-seed conebush)
 Needle-leaf Conebushes

platyspermum